Elizabethtown Community and Technical College (ECTC) is a community college in Elizabethtown, Kentucky.  It is one of 16 two-year, open-admissions colleges of the Kentucky Community and Technical College System (KCTCS).

History
It was formed by the consolidation of Elizabethtown Community College (est. 1964) and Elizabethtown Technical College (est. 1965) in 2004. ECTC is accredited by the Southern Association of Colleges and Schools (SACS).

In 1997, the Kentucky General Assembly passed the Postsecondary Education Improvement Act of 1997, separating Kentucky's community colleges from the University of Kentucky's Community College System and uniting them under a new entity, the Kentucky Community and Technical College System. This separation left ECC to operate for nearly a year and a half without formal accreditation, as the community colleges had previously received accreditation through their connection with the University of Kentucky. Once KCTCS was established, this oversight was corrected.

The Elizabethtown Japanese School (エリザベスタウン日本人補習校 Erizabesutaun Nihonjin Hoshūkō), a weekend Japanese program, held its classes at the college as of 2015.

Campus 
ECTC has four campuses. The main campus is located in Elizabethtown off the 31-W bypass. In addition there is a Fort Knox campus, a Springfield campus, and a Leitchfield campus. The technical college also offers seven off-campus locations where students of Hardin, and 11 surrounding counties can attend instructional classes.

Service area 

The primary service area of ECTC includes:

 Breckinridge County
 Green County
 Grayson County
 Hardin County
 LaRue County
 Marion County
 Meade County
 Nelson County
 Taylor County
 Washington County

References

External links
Official website

Elizabethtown, Kentucky
Kentucky Community and Technical College System
Educational institutions established in 2004
Universities and colleges accredited by the Southern Association of Colleges and Schools
Education in Hardin County, Kentucky
Buildings and structures in Hardin County, Kentucky
NJCAA athletics
2004 establishments in Kentucky